Muaaz ibn Amr was a companion of Muhammad.  He and his brother, Mowaz ibn Amr, wounded Abu Jahl in the Battle of Badr.

Life 
Before the hijra, Muhammad had appointed Masab ibn Umair to carry out Dawah, which he did.

Amr bin Jamooh a devotee of the deity Manāt and part of the Banu Salmah tribe of Medina had 3 sons, Muawwaz ibn Amr, Muaaz ibn Amr and Khallad ibn Amr submitted to the will of Allah and embraced Islam immediately. On their initiation, even their mother, Hind bint Amr, professed the shahadah. But they kept their faith secret lest it hurt their father.

Her husband was unaware of her new religion and one day warned her of the "danger" posed by Masab to the traditional faith of Medina and asked her to safeguard their sons against it. Hind advised him to listen to what their second son Muaaz had to tell them, Muaaz then recited the surah Fatihah. The recitation made an impact on her husband, but he was reluctant to abandon Manāt.

After much prayer, and the repeated theft of the statue by his sons, Amr decided that Manāt was not worthy of worship and also adopted Islam.

Abu Jahl (Amr ibn Hisham) was killed in the Battle of Badr by two youth, Muaaz ibn Amr and Muawwidh ibn Afra'.

See also
Sahaba
List of expeditions of Muhammad

References

External links
http://www.islamicvoice.com/june.2003/child.htm
http://gawaher.com/index.php?s=edb9015dc704391c95eb00389dc7b01c&showtopic=15175&pid=134648&st=0&#entry134648

 Sahabah who participated in the battle of Badr